"It's the Little Things" is a 1967 single by Sonny James.  "It's the Little Things" was Sonny James' twenty-fifth release on the country chart, the song went to number one on the country chart for five weeks and spent a total of fourteen weeks on the charts.

Chart performance

References

1967 singles
Sonny James songs
Capitol Records singles
1967 songs